Cruisin is the second leader album by Japanese pianist Junko Onishi, released on July 21, 1993 in Japan. It was released on April 5, 1994 by Blue Note Records.

Track listing

Personnel
Junko Onishi - Piano
Rodney Whitaker - Bass
Billy Higgins - Drums

Production
Executive Producer - Hitoshi Namekata
Co-Producer - Junko Onishi
Recording and Mixing Engineer - Jim Anderson
Assistant Engineer - Victor Deyglio
Mastering engineer - Yoshio Okazuki
Cover Photograph - Kunihiro Takuma
Inner Photograph - William Claxton, David Tan
Art director - Kaoru Taku
A&R - Yoshiko Tsuge

External links
Junko Onishi HP

References

1993 albums
Junko Onishi albums